Tenzin is a Bhutanese politician who has been a member of the National Assembly of Bhutan, since October 2018.

Education 
He holds a Bachelor of Arts degree in Geography and Buddhist Literature from Sherubtse College.

Political career 
Before joining politics, Tenzin was a community social worker.

He was elected to the National Assembly of Bhutan as a candidate of DNT from Khatoed Laya constituency in 2018 Bhutanese National Assembly election. He received 588 votes and defeated Changa Dawa, a candidate of Druk Phuensum Tshogpa. He also participated in the 2008 and 2013 elections.

References 

1982 births
Living people
Druk Nyamrup Tshogpa politicians
Bhutanese MNAs 2018–2023
Bhutanese politicians
Sherubtse College alumni
Druk Nyamrup Tshogpa MNAs